= Jean Renoir bibliography =

A list of books and essays by or about Jean Renoir:

- Bazin, André (1992). Jean Renoir. Lightning Source Incorporated. ISBN 978-0-306-80465-6.
- Bergan, Ronald (1995). Jean Renoir: Projections of Paradise. Overlook Press. ISBN 978-0-87951-608-6.
- Bertin, Célia (1 April 1991). Jean Renoir. Johns Hopkins University Press. ISBN 978-0-8018-4184-2.
- Cardullo, Bert (2005). Jean Renoir: Interviews. Univ. Press of Mississippi. ISBN 978-1-57806-731-2.
- Durgnat, Raymond (1 January 1974). Jean Renoir. University of California Press. p. 368. ISBN 978-0-520-02283-6.
- Faulkner, Christopher (1979). Jean Renoir, a guide to references and resources. G. K. Hall. ISBN 978-0-8161-7912-1.
- Gharib, Simin (1979). Art/nature, theater/life: a study of Jean Renoir's realism. Case Western Reserve University.
- Gilliatt, Penelope; Renoir, Jean (January 1975). Jean Renoir: essays, conversations, and reviews. McGraw-Hill.
- Glasberg, Roxanne (1973). A Critical Analysis of Jean Renoir's Boudu Sauvé Des Eaux and Le Crime de Monsieur Lange. University of Wisconsin--Madison.
- Leprohon, Pierre (1971). Jean Renoir. Seghers.
- Phillips, Alastair; Vincendeau, Ginette (4 June 2013). A Companion to Jean Renoir. Wiley. ISBN 978-1-4443-3853-9.
- Phillips, Donald T (5 July 2010). The Hidden Renoir. Donald T Phillips. p. 100. ISBN 978-0-9828484-0-1.
- Renoir, Jean (1989). Renoir on Renoir: Interviews, Essays, and Remarks. CUP Archive. ISBN 978-0-521-38593-0.
- Renoir, Jean (2001). Renoir, My Father. New York Review Books. ISBN 978-0-940322-77-6.
- O'Shaughnessy, Martin (20 October 2000). Jean Renoir. Manchester University Press. ISBN 978-0-7190-5063-3.
- Sesonske, Alexander (1980). Jean Renoir, the French films, 1924-1939. Harvard University Press. ISBN 978-0-674-47360-7.
- Spaak, Charles; Renoir, Jean (1968). La grande illusion: a film. Lorrimer Publishing, Ltd.
- Vitanza, Elizabeth Ann (2007). Rewriting the Rules of the Game: Jean Renoir in America, 1941--1947. ProQuest. p. 24. ISBN 978-0-549-44065-9.
